The Mount Diablo meridian, established in 1851, is a principal meridian extending north and south from its initial point atop Mount Diablo in California at W 121° 54.845.  Established under the U.S. Public Land Survey System, it is used to describe lands in most of northern California and all of Nevada.  Mount Diablo also marks the baseline at latitude 37°52′54″N.

See also
List of principal and guide meridians and base lines of the United States

References

External links

Meridians and base lines of the United States
Mount Diablo
Named meridians
Northern California
Geography of California
1851 establishments in California